The France's 1981–1982 nuclear test series was a group of 22 nuclear tests conducted in 1981–1982. These tests followed the 1979–1980 French nuclear tests series and preceded the 1983–1985 French nuclear tests series.

References

French nuclear weapons testing
1981 in France
1982 in France